Pum is a village in Batken Region of Kyrgyzstan. It is part of the Kadamjay District. Its population was 1,009 in 2021.

Nearby towns and villages include Maydan and Kara-Kyshtak.

References

External links
 Satellite map at Maplandia.com

Populated places in Batken Region